The women's discus throw event at the 2006 African Championships in Athletics was held at the Stade Germain Comarmond on August 11, 2006.

Results
Distances shown are in meters.

References
Results 
Results

2006 African Championships in Athletics
Discus throw at the African Championships in Athletics
2006 in women's athletics